Neville House may refer to:

Neville House (Mobile, Alabama), listed on the National Register of Historic Places in Mobile County, Alabama
Neville-Patterson-Lamkin House Arlington, Kentucky, listed on the National Register of Historic Places in Carlisle County, Kentucky
Neville House (Staten Island)
Neville House (Heidelberg, Pennsylvania), listed on the National Register of Historic Places in Allegheny County, Pennsylvania